Mamlakat Akberdyevna Nakhangova (1924 — 2003) was a Soviet cotton picker, member of the Stakhanovite movement, the youngest and first among the  pioneers knights of the  highest order of the USSR, the Order of Lenin (1935).

During the World War II she participated in London at a peace conference.

In adult life Nakhangova was a Soviet philologist, candidate of philological sciences; and Associate Professor of the Tajik State Pedagogical University. In 1970-1977 she was the head of the department of foreign languages of the medical institute in Dushanbe.

Mamlakat Nakhangova became the heroine of the first poem by Mirzo Tursunzoda The Sun of the Country.

She was married, and had two children, a daughter named Roxana and a son named Alisher.

References

External links
 История одной фотографии. В объятиях вождя
     Дети-герои.  Эстафета пионерского подвига

1924 births
2003 deaths
Recipients of the Order of Lenin
Propaganda in the Soviet Union
Soviet philologists
20th-century philologists
Tajikistani philologists
Tajik Soviet Socialist Republic people